Tomás Saldaña (born 23 March 1961) is a Spanish former racing driver.

24 Hours of Le Mans in 1992, 1993, 1994, 1995, 1997, 1999, 2000.
1985 FF Spanish Championship - Vice Champion
1986 R5 I Spanish Championship - Third
1988 R5Turbo Spanish Championship - Champion      
1993 Interserie Sportscar Championship - Vice Champion. 2002 Iberian and Spanish GT Championship - Vicechampion.

References

1961 births
Living people
Spanish racing drivers
24 Hours of Le Mans drivers
World Sportscar Championship drivers